Dr. Viliami Uasike Latu is a Tongan politician and Cabinet Minister.

After completing secondary education at Tonga High School, he became a high school teacher at the Mailefihi & Siuʻilikutapu College (in Vavaʻu) in 1991. He obtained a Bachelor of Arts degree from ʻAtenisi University in 1995, then continued his studies at the University of Auckland (New Zealand), obtaining a Graduate Diploma in Arts degree in 1997, then a Master of Arts degree in political science in 1999. He returned to Tonga to work as a civil servant, and served as Assistant Secretary to the Prime Minister's Office from 2000 to 2003, before beginning doctoral studies in Japan, on a scholarship provided by the Japanese government. He completed his Ph.D. in Asia Pacific Studies at the Ritsumeikan Asia Pacific University in 2006.

Returning to Tonga, he served as principal assistant secretary to the Prime Minister's Officer in 2006 and 2007, then (briefly) as assistant to the chief executive officer and public relations officer at the Ministry of Education in 2008. In May of that year, he was appointed clerk of the Legislative Assembly of Tonga. 

He stood unsuccessfully as an independent candidate for a People's Representative seat in Vavaʻu in the April 2008 general election. He received 12.7% of the vote in Vavaʻu, finishing third of twenty-two candidates, and thus narrowly missing out on being elected as one of Vavaʻu's two representatives. He stood again in the November 2010 general election, and this time was easily elected in constituency 16 (one of Vavaʻu's three newly established constituencies), with 43.7% of the vote. New Prime Minister Lord Tuʻivakanō subsequently appointed him to Cabinet as Minister for Police, Prisons and Fire Services. The appointment was controversial as Latu had previously been charged with assaulting his wife. In August 2011 he attracted further controversy by refusing to renew the contract of police commissioner Chris Kelley, effectively firing him, and appointing himself as acting police commissioner.

On September 1, 2011, he was reshuffled to the Ministry for Tourism. He lost his seat in the November 2014 general election. He stood again at the 2016 Vavaʻu 16 by-election and in the 2017 election but was unsuccessful.

He was re-elected to the seat of Vavaʻu 16 in the 2021 election. On 28 December 2021 he was appointed to the Cabinet of Siaosi Sovaleni as Minister of Trade and Economic Development.

References

Members of the Legislative Assembly of Tonga
Government ministers of Tonga
Living people
University of Auckland alumni
Tongan schoolteachers
Ritsumeikan Asia Pacific University alumni
Independent politicians in Tonga
People from Vavaʻu
Year of birth missing (living people)